Casey Thompson  (born October 3, 1998) is an American football quarterback who plays for Nebraska.

High school career
Thompson played his first three years of high school football at Southmoore High School in Moore, Oklahoma. Prior to his 2017 senior season, Thompson transferred to Newcastle High School in Newcastle, Oklahoma. As a four star recruit, Thompson committed to The University of Texas on April 13, 2017.

College career

Texas
During Thompson's first two years at Texas, he served as the backup quarterback behind Sam Ehlinger. At the 2020 Alamo Bowl, Thompson entered the game after Ehlinger suffered an injury. During that game, Thompson went 8–10 with 170 yards and 4 touchdowns in the 55-23 blowout win over the Colorado Buffaloes. His 4 TDs tied the Alamo Bowl record.

After Ehlinger left for the NFL, Thompson competed with Hudson Card for the starting quarterback position. Card initially won the starting job, but Thompson was promoted to starter for week 3. In his first collegiate career start, he went 15-for-18 on pass attempts, threw for 164 yards, 2 touchdowns, and an interception in a 58-0 shutout victory over the Rice Owls. Thompson was the starter in a 70-35 victory over Texas Tech, the first time the Longhorns scored 70 or more points in a game since 2005. Thompson started 10 games for the Longhorns and posted a 4-6 record. He threw for 2,113 yards and 24 touchdowns against nine interceptions while also tacking on another four touchdowns with his legs.  

At the conclusion of the 2021 season, Thompson entered himself into the transfer portal after Ohio State quarterback Quinn Ewers committed to transfer to Texas. He would eventually transfer to Nebraska.

Nebraska
On January 7, 2022, Thompson announced his transfer to the University of Nebraska–Lincoln to play for the Nebraska Cornhuskers football team. 

In 2022, Thompson started 10 games, going 4-6 for Nebraska, but missed two games with an injury.

Statistics

Personal life
Thompson is the son of former Oklahoma quarterback Charles Thompson.

References

External links
 Texas Longhorns bio

1998 births
Living people
American football quarterbacks
Nebraska Cornhuskers football players
Texas Longhorns football players
Players of American football from Oklahoma
Sportspeople from Oklahoma City